Jackiewicz is a Polish surname. Notable people with the surname include:

 Dariusz Jackiewicz (born 1973), Polish footballer
 Dawid Jackiewicz (born 1973), Polish politician
 Rafał Jackiewicz (born 1977), Polish professional boxer

See also
 Jankiewicz

Polish-language surnames
Patronymic surnames